Nasser Bader Al-Wuhaib (born 29 July 1988) is a Kuwaiti international footballer who plays as a defender for Kuwaiti club Al-Shabab.

Al-Wuhaib played for 13 years at Kazma. He was part of the team that advanced to the knockout rounds of the 2012 AFC Cup, scoring a goal against East Bengal in the group stage. He left the club at the end of the 2019–20 season, joining fellow Kuwait Premier League club Al-Shabab on a one-year contract.

References

External links
 
 

1988 births
Living people
Kuwaiti footballers
Sportspeople from Kuwait City
Association football defenders
Kazma SC players
Kuwait Premier League players
Kuwait international footballers
Olympic footballers of Kuwait
Asian Games competitors for Kuwait
Footballers at the 2010 Asian Games
Al-Shabab SC (Kuwait) players